Perseus Karlström (born 2 May 1990) is a Swedish male racewalker. He competed in the 20 kilometres walk event at the 2013 World Championships in Athletics. He also competed in the 20 kilometres walk event at the 2015 World Championships in Athletics in Beijing, China, but did not finish. He was bronze medallist at the 2019 World Athletics Championships in Qatar 2019.

Born in Växjö, he is the son of international racewalker Siv Gustavsson. His brother, Ato Ibáñez, is also an international racewalker for Sweden.

See also
Sweden at the 2015 World Championships in Athletics

References

External links

Living people
1990 births
People from Växjö
Swedish male racewalkers
Olympic athletes of Sweden
Athletes (track and field) at the 2016 Summer Olympics
Athletes (track and field) at the 2020 Summer Olympics
World Athletics Championships athletes for Sweden
World Athletics Championships medalists
Sportspeople from Kronoberg County
20th-century Swedish people
21st-century Swedish people
European Athletics Championships medalists